
Year 289 (CCLXXXIX) was a common year starting on Tuesday (link will display the full calendar) of the Julian calendar. At the time, it was known as the Year of the Consulship of Bassus and Quintianus (or, less frequently, year 1042 Ab urbe condita). The denomination 289 for this year has been used since the early medieval period, when the Anno Domini calendar era became the prevalent method in Europe for naming years.

Events 
 By place 
 Roman Empire 
 In this or the following year, Emperor Diocletian campaigns with success against the Sarmatians. The future emperor Galerius may have distinguished himself during this campaign.
 In this or the following year, Maximian attempts to reconquer Britain from the usurper Carausius but is defeated at sea.

Births 
 Flavia Maxima Fausta, Roman empress (d. 326)
 Yu Liang (or Yuangui), Chinese politician (d. 340)

Deaths 
 Alexander of Rome, Christian martyr
 Kyriaki the Great, Christian martyr
 Xun Xu (or Gongzeng), Chinese official

References